Paul Schneider (born June 24, 1976) is a retired American soccer player who played professionally in the USL A-League.

Schneider began his college career at Long Island University before transferring to George Mason University in 1996.  That summer, he also played for the Long Island Rough Riders U-23 team.  Schneider played for ASV Durlach during the 1998-1999 season.  He then returned to the United States, briefly played for New York Hota of the Cosmopolitan Soccer League before signing with the Minnesota Thunder of the USISL A-League.  In 2001, Schneider played the Major League Soccer pre-season with the Tampa Bay Mutiny.  He saw time in only one regular season game before being released.  Schneider returned to the Thunder.   In June 2001, the Thunder traded Schneider to the Atlanta Silverbacks.

References

External links
 

Living people
1976 births
American soccer players
American expatriate soccer players
Atlanta Silverbacks players
George Mason Patriots men's soccer players
LIU Sharks men's soccer players
Major League Soccer players
Minnesota Thunder players
New York Hota players
Tampa Bay Mutiny players
A-League (1995–2004) players
ASV Durlach players
Association football forwards